John Law (October 28, 1796 – October 7, 1873) was an American politician who represented Indiana in the United States House of Representatives from 1861-1865. He was the son of Lyman Law, and grandson of Richard Law, and Amasa Learned.

Law was born in New London, Connecticut. He pursued classical studies and was graduated from Yale College in 1814. Later, he studied law and he was admitted to the bar in 1817 and he commenced practice in Vincennes, Indiana. Law was the prosecuting attorney 1818-1820 and a member of the Indiana House of Representatives in 1824 and 1825. He was again the prosecuting attorney 1825-1828 and judge of the seventh judicial circuit 1830 and 1831. He served as the receiver of the land office at Vincennes 1838-1842 and was again a judge from 1844 to 1850, when he resigned.

Law moved to Evansville, Indiana in 1851. He invested in large tracts of land and was an author. He was appointed by President Franklin Pierce judge of the court of land claims and served from 1855 to 1857. He was elected as a Democrat to the Thirty-seventh and Thirty-eighth Congresses (March 4, 1861 – March 3, 1865) but was not a candidate for renomination in 1864. After leaving Congress, he resumed the practice of law. He died in Evansville, Indiana 1873 and was buried in Greenlawn Cemetery, Vincennes, Indiana.

External links

 

1796 births
1873 deaths
Democratic Party members of the Indiana House of Representatives
People from Vincennes, Indiana
Yale College alumni
Politicians from New London, Connecticut
Democratic Party members of the United States House of Representatives from Indiana
Indiana state court judges
19th-century American politicians
19th-century American judges